Sergei Anatolyevich Yashin (6 March 1962 – 12 April 2022) was a Soviet and Russian professional ice hockey left winger.

Yashin played in the Soviet Championship League for HC Dynamo Moscow, the Eishockey-Bundesliga for EHC Dynamo Berlin, and the Russian Superleague for SKA Saint Petersburg. He was also a member of the Soviet Union men's national ice hockey team and played in the 1988 Winter Olympics where he won a gold medal.

Yashin was inducted into the Russian and Soviet Hockey Hall of Fame in 1988. He died on 12 April 2022, at the age of 60.

Honours

National
HC Dynamo Moscow
 Soviet Ice Hockey League winner: 1989–90; runner-up: 1979–80, 1984–85, 1985–86, 1986–87, 1988–89; third place: 1980–81, 1981–82, 1982–83, 1987–88

International
Soviet Union
Olympic Games winner: 1988
Ice Hockey World Championships winner: 1986, 1989; third place: 1985

Soviet Union U21
IIHF World Junior Championship third place: 1981

Soviet Union U18
IIHF European Junior Championships winner: 1980; third place: 1979

Career statistics

Regular season and playoffs

International

References

External links
 

1962 births
2022 deaths
HC Davos players
Dizel Penza players
Edmonton Oilers draft picks
SC Dynamo Berlin (ice hockey) players
HC Dynamo Moscow players
HC Neftekhimik Nizhnekamsk players
Ice hockey players at the 1988 Winter Olympics
SKA Saint Petersburg players
ERC Selb players
Honoured Masters of Sport of the USSR
Soviet expatriate ice hockey players
Soviet ice hockey left wingers
Sportspeople from Penza
Olympic gold medalists for the Soviet Union
Olympic ice hockey players of the Soviet Union
Olympic medalists in ice hockey
Russian ice hockey left wingers
Deaths from the COVID-19 pandemic in Russia